Matilde Moraschi (11 April 1910 – 16 April 2004) was an Italian sprinter and basketball player. She competed in the women's 100 metres at the 1928 Summer Olympics. her basketball teams were six times champions of Italy:
Canottieri Milano: 1934 and 1935;
Ambrosiana-Inter: 1936, 1937, 1937-1938 and 1938-1939.

References

External links
 

1910 births
2004 deaths
Athletes (track and field) at the 1928 Summer Olympics
Italian female sprinters
Olympic athletes of Italy
Place of birth missing
Olympic female sprinters